Luigi Omodei (20 March 1657, in Madrid – 18 August 1706, in Rome) was a cardinal of Italian descent. His uncle Luigi Omodei (1607–1685) was also a cardinal.

Life
His parents were the Milanese nobleman Agostino Omodei, marquess of Almonacid in Spain, and his third wife Maria Pacheco de Moura, from Madrid. He fulfilled several duties in the Roman Curia and was made a cardinal by pope Alexander VIII in the consistory of 13 February 1690. He took part in the 1691 and 1700 conclaves.

Sources

1657 births
1706 deaths
17th-century Italian cardinals
Cardinals created by Pope Alexander VIII
18th-century Italian cardinals